Mister Charlesworth is a British crime television series which originally aired on the BBC in 1957. It is a police procedural featuring Detective Chief Inspector Charlesworth investigating crime around London's Soho. It was followed by several sequels featuring Charlesworth, beginning with Big Guns the following year.

Cast

Main
 Wensley Pithey as Det. Chief Insp. Charlesworth
 Nigel Davenport as Sgt. Spence
 Edward Higgins as  PC Wrothbury
 Anna Burden as Alice Charlesworth
 John Nettleton as  Police Constable

Other
Actors who appeared in individual episodes of the series included Michael Caine, Wilfrid Brambell, Ralph Nossek, Erik Chitty, Frank Middlemass, Cyril Shaps and Donovan Winter.

References

Bibliography
 Radio Times, Volume 137. G. Newnes, 1957.

External links
 

BBC television dramas
1957 British television series debuts
1957 British television series endings
1950s British crime television series
English-language television shows